Deportivo Masaya is a football team in Nicaragua playing in the Segunda  División de Nicaragua, the second category of football in the country.

History
Deportivo Masaya started life in 1978 in the Masaya Department, in Nicaragua. Thanks to the efforts of husband and wife, Don Arnoldo and Matty Chávez, they quickly began to gain a following. After five years they gained their first major trophy, the Copa de Nicaragua in 1983.

There followed a golden age for the club, winning their first Liga Primera de Nicaragua in 1984. After a failed defence of their title, they took their second league title in 1986. "El Equipo del Pueblo" (The Peoples Club) had made their mark on Nicaraguan football. 

The clubs history has not been easy, however, has endured a tough existence since those heady glory days and have slipped out of the top flight. They are challenging to get the club back in to the top flight. The club is run as community club and wants to continue contributing to the community through sport, trying to help the young people of Masaya "The city of flowers", find a healthy and more productive path through football.

Honours
Liga Primera de Nicaragua: 2
 1984, 1986

Copa de Nicaragua: 1
 1983

Squad 2019

Coaching staff

Former players

  Antonio Escorcia
 Javier Martínez
 Omar Blandón
 Carlos Téllez
 Gustavo Montenegro
 José Montenegro
 Heriberto
 Boanerges Franco
 Guillermo Castillo
 Roberto Castillo
 Andrés Gauna
 Samuel Páramo
 Javier Martínez
 Alejandro Ortega
 Marlon González
 Balford Montenegro
 Alfonso Jirón
 Julio Flores

External links
Facebook

Football clubs in Nicaragua